The Red Brick Store in Nauvoo, Illinois, was a building that was constructed and owned by Joseph Smith, the founder of the Latter Day Saint movement.

Original building

Smith constructed the Red Brick Store in 1841. The building became a center of economic, political, religious, and social activity among the Latter Day Saints. In addition to being a mercantile store, the second floor of the building also served as the headquarters of the Church of Jesus Christ of Latter Day Saints for a period of time. Members would visit the store to pay their tithing and other offerings to the church.

Notable events
A number of important events in Latter Day Saint history occurred in the Red Brick Store, including:

the organization of the Relief Society, the church's organization for women, on March 17, 1842; and
the first performance of the Nauvoo Endowment ordinance, on May 4, 1842.

Destruction and rebuilding
After Joseph Smith was killed and the majority of Latter Day Saints left Nauvoo, the Red Brick Store fell into disrepair. Eventually, it was torn down and the bricks were used to construct new buildings in Nauvoo.

In 1980, the Reorganized Church of Jesus Christ of Latter Day Saints rebuilt the Red Brick Store on the original foundation as part of its 1980 sesquicentennial celebrations. Today, the Red Brick Store is owned and operated as a tourist attraction by the Community of Christ. The Store sells goods that are similar to the kind that were sold in the Store in the 1840s.

Manti, Utah
In Manti, Utah, the headquarters of the True and Living Church of Jesus Christ of Saints of the Last Days (TLC Church) is located in a building named the Red Brick Store in honor of Smith's original structure in Nauvoo.

See also
Council House (Salt Lake City)
Endowment House
Anointed Quorum
Plano Stone Church

References

 Robert T. Bray (1973). Archaeological Investigations at the Joseph Smith Red Brick Store, Nauvoo, Illinois (Columbia: University of Missouri Press)
 Roger D. Launius and F. Mark McKiernan (1985). Joseph Smith, Jr.'s Red Brick Store (Macomb: Western Illinois University Press)

External links

Joseph Smith's Red Brick Store – official website for Community of Christ tourist attraction

19th-century Latter Day Saint religious buildings and structures
Buildings and structures in Hancock County, Illinois
Commercial buildings completed in 1841
Community of Christ
Former religious buildings and structures in Illinois
Headquarters in the United States
Latter Day Saint movement in Illinois
Nauvoo, Illinois
Rebuilt buildings and structures in Illinois
Religious buildings and structures completed in 1841
Religious buildings and structures completed in 1980
Retail buildings in Illinois
Significant places in Mormonism
Tourist attractions in Hancock County, Illinois
Mormon museums in the United States